The Central Constituency (No.208) is a Russian legislative constituency in Moscow. The constituency includes Central Moscow and Lefortovo District of the South-Eastern Moscow.

Members elected

Election results

1993

|-
! colspan=2 style="background-color:#E9E9E9;text-align:left;vertical-align:top;" |Candidate
! style="background-color:#E9E9E9;text-align:left;vertical-align:top;" |Party
! style="background-color:#E9E9E9;text-align:right;" |Votes
! style="background-color:#E9E9E9;text-align:right;" |%
|-
|style="background-color: " |
|align=left|Artyom Tarasov
|align=left|Independent
|37,966
|14.12%
|-
|style="background-color: " |
|align=left|Fyodor Shelov-Kovedyaev
|align=left|Independent
| -
|13.76%
|-
| colspan="5" style="background-color:#E9E9E9;"|
|- style="font-weight:bold"
| colspan="3" style="text-align:left;" | Total
| 268,877
| 100%
|-
| colspan="5" style="background-color:#E9E9E9;"|
|- style="font-weight:bold"
| colspan="4" |Source:
|
|}

1995

|-
! colspan=2 style="background-color:#E9E9E9;text-align:left;vertical-align:top;" |Candidate
! style="background-color:#E9E9E9;text-align:left;vertical-align:top;" |Party
! style="background-color:#E9E9E9;text-align:right;" |Votes
! style="background-color:#E9E9E9;text-align:right;" |%
|-
|style="background-color: " |
|align=left|Nikolay Gonchar
|align=left|Independent
|74,175
|25.85%
|-
|style="background-color: #3A46CE" |
|align=left|Fyodor Shelov-Kovedyaev
|align=left|Democratic Choice of Russia – United Democrats
|33,631
|11.72%
|-
|style="background-color: " |
|align=left|Mikhail Motorin
|align=left|Yabloko
|27,551
|9.60%
|-
|style="background-color: " |
|align=left|Aleksey Podberezkin
|align=left|Communist Party
|26,811
|9.34%
|-
|style="background-color: #1A1A1A" |
|align=left|Aleksandr Krasnov
|align=left|Stanislav Govorukhin Bloc
|16,482
|5.74%
|-
|style="background-color: #2C299A" |
|align=left|Sergey Goncharov
|align=left|Congress of Russian Communities
|16,051
|5.59%
|-
|style="background-color: " |
|align=left|Andrey Nuykin
|align=left|Independent
|10,813
|3.77%
|-
|style="background-color: " |
|align=left|Tatyana Krylova
|align=left|Independent
|9,080
|3.16%
|-
|style="background-color: " |
|align=left|Galina Khovanskaya
|align=left|Independent
|7,925
|2.76%
|-
|style="background-color: " |
|align=left|Valery Belousov
|align=left|Independent
|6,490
|2.26%
|-
|style="background-color: "|
|align=left|Boris Uvarov
|align=left|Power to the People!
|5,967
|2.08%
|-
|style="background-color: " |
|align=left|Andrey Shestakov
|align=left|Independent
|5,030
|1.75%
|-
|style="background-color: " |
|align=left|Andrey Strygin
|align=left|Liberal Democratic Party
|3,816
|1.33%
|-
|style="background-color: " |
|align=left|Nikolay Chigarentsev
|align=left|Independent
|3,357
|1.17%
|-
|style="background-color: #D50000" |
|align=left|Sergey Chernyakhovsky
|align=left|Communists and Working Russia - for the Soviet Union
|3,349
|1.17%
|-
|style="background-color: " |
|align=left|Yevgeny Shvedov
|align=left|Independent
|2,285
|0.80%
|-
|style="background-color: " |
|align=left|Sergey Drogush
|align=left|Independent
|1,174
|0.41%
|-
|style="background-color: " |
|align=left|Igor Brumel'
|align=left|Independent
|1,044
|0.36%
|-
|style="background-color:#000000"|
|colspan=2 |against all
|26,975
|9.40%
|-
| colspan="5" style="background-color:#E9E9E9;"|
|- style="font-weight:bold"
| colspan="3" style="text-align:left;" | Total
| 286,917
| 100%
|-
| colspan="5" style="background-color:#E9E9E9;"|
|- style="font-weight:bold"
| colspan="4" |Source:
|
|}

1999

|-
! colspan=2 style="background-color:#E9E9E9;text-align:left;vertical-align:top;" |Candidate
! style="background-color:#E9E9E9;text-align:left;vertical-align:top;" |Party
! style="background-color:#E9E9E9;text-align:right;" |Votes
! style="background-color:#E9E9E9;text-align:right;" |%
|-
|style="background-color: "|
|align=left|Nikolay Gonchar (incumbent)
|align=left|Independent
|88,456
|32.24%
|-
|style="background-color:"|
|align=left|Aleksandr Minkin
|align=left|Independent
|65,644
|23.92%
|-
|style="background-color:#1042A5"|
|align=left|Alla Gerber
|align=left|Union of Right Forces
|31,048
|11.32%
|-
|style="background-color:"|
|align=left|Aleksey Rogozhin
|align=left|Independent
|14,662
|5.34%
|-
|style="background-color: #084284" |
|align=left|Aleksey Podberezkin
|align=left|Spiritual Heritage
|12,601
|4.59%
|-
|style="background-color:"|
|align=left|Sergey Ruzavin
|align=left|Independent
|11,055
|4.03%
|-
|style="background-color: " |
|align=left|Gennady Bulgakov
|align=left|Liberal Democratic Party
|4,175
|1.52%
|-
|style="background-color: " |
|align=left|Valery Bobkov
|align=left|Independent
|3,399
|1.24%
|-
|style="background-color: " |
|align=left|Sergey Shevchenko
|align=left|Independent
|3,095
|1.13%
|-
|style="background-color: #020266" |
|align=left|Grigory Loza
|align=left|Russian Socialist Party
|2,783
|1.01%
|-
|style="background-color:#000000"|
|colspan=2 |against all
|32,151
|11.72%
|-
| colspan="5" style="background-color:#E9E9E9;"|
|- style="font-weight:bold"
| colspan="3" style="text-align:left;" | Total
| 274,390
| 100%
|-
| colspan="5" style="background-color:#E9E9E9;"|
|- style="font-weight:bold"
| colspan="4" |Source:
|
|}

2003

|-
! colspan=2 style="background-color:#E9E9E9;text-align:left;vertical-align:top;" |Candidate
! style="background-color:#E9E9E9;text-align:left;vertical-align:top;" |Party
! style="background-color:#E9E9E9;text-align:right;" |Votes
! style="background-color:#E9E9E9;text-align:right;" |%
|-
|style="background-color: "|
|align=left|Nikolay Gonchar (incumbent)
|align=left|Independent
|97,066
|36.57%
|-
|style="background-color: " |
|align=left|Aleksandr Pleshakov
|align=left|Independent
|34,860
|13.13%
|-
|style="background-color: " |
|align=left|Olga Andronova
|align=left|Rodina
|28,780
|10.84%
|-
|style="background-color: " |
|align=left|Yelena Karpukhina
|align=left|Communist Party
|26,471
|9.97%
|-
|style="background-color: " |
|align=left|Aleksandr Russky
|align=left|Independent
|5,837
|2.20%
|-
|style="background-color: " |
|align=left|Boris Pashintsev
|align=left|Independent
|4,789
|1.80%
|-
|style="background-color: #7C73CC" |
|align=left|Igor Vashurkin
|align=left|Great Russia–Eurasian Union
|3,848
|1.45%
|-
|style="background-color: #164C8C" |
|align=left|Aleksandr Kuznetsov
|align=left|United Russian Party Rus'
|3,848
|1.45%
|-
|style="background-color:#000000"|
|colspan=2 |against all
|56,489
|21.28%
|-
| colspan="5" style="background-color:#E9E9E9;"|
|- style="font-weight:bold"
| colspan="3" style="text-align:left;" | Total
| 266,649
| 100%
|-
| colspan="5" style="background-color:#E9E9E9;"|
|- style="font-weight:bold"
| colspan="4" |Source:
|
|}

2016

|-
! colspan=2 style="background-color:#E9E9E9;text-align:left;vertical-align:top;" |Candidate
! style="background-color:#E9E9E9;text-align:left;vertical-align:top;" |Party
! style="background-color:#E9E9E9;text-align:right;" |Votes
! style="background-color:#E9E9E9;text-align:right;" |%
|-
|style="background-color: " |
|align=left|Nikolay Gonchar
|align=left|United Russia
|57,110
|34.25%
|-
|style="background-color: " |
|align=left|Pavel Tarasov
|align=left|Communist Party
|21,442
|12.86%
|-
|style="background: ;"| 
|align=left|Andrey Zubov
|align=left|People's Freedom Party
|18,789
|11.27%
|-
|style="background-color: " |
|align=left|Maria Baronova
|align=left|Independent
|13,197
|7.92%
|-
|style="background-color: " |
|align=left|Mikhail Degtyarev
|align=left|Liberal Democratic Party
|12,573
|7.54%
|-
|style="background-color: " |
|align=left|Kristina Simonyan
|align=left|A Just Russia
|8,095
|4.86%
|-
|style="background-color: " |
|align=left|Ksenia Sokolova
|align=left|Party of Growth
|6,912
|4.15%
|-
|style="background-color: " |
|align=left|Maria Katasonova
|align=left|Rodina
|6,569
|3.94%
|-
|style="background: #E62020;"| 
|align=left|Dmitry Zakharov
|align=left|Communists of Russia
|4,956
|2.97%
|-
|style="background: "| 
|align=left|Anton Umnikov
|align=left|The Greens
|4,125
|2.47%
|-
|style="background: "| 
|align=left|Andrey Rudenko
|align=left|Civic Platform
|3,160
|1.90%
|-
|style="background: "| 
|align=left|Oleg Eston
|align=left|Patriots of Russia
|2,744
|1.65%
|-
|style="background: #00A650"| 
|align=left|Aleksey Mikhaylov
|align=left|Civilian Power
|2,338
|1.40%
|-
| colspan="5" style="background-color:#E9E9E9;"|
|- style="font-weight:bold"
| colspan="3" style="text-align:left;" | Total
| 166,733
| 100%
|-
| colspan="5" style="background-color:#E9E9E9;"|
|- style="font-weight:bold"
| colspan="4" |Source:
|
|}

2021

|-
! colspan=2 style="background-color:#E9E9E9;text-align:left;vertical-align:top;" |Candidate
! style="background-color:#E9E9E9;text-align:left;vertical-align:top;" |Party
! style="background-color:#E9E9E9;text-align:right;" |Votes
! style="background-color:#E9E9E9;text-align:right;" |%
|-
|style="background-color: " |
|align=left|Oleg Leonov
|align=left|Independent
|57,505
|26.28%
|-
|style="background-color: " |
|align=left|Sergey Mitrokhin
|align=left|Yabloko
|47,815
|21.85%
|-
|style="background-color: " |
|align=left|Nina Ostanina
|align=left|Communist Party
|22,146
|10.12%
|-
|style="background-color: "|
|align=left|Maksim Shevchenko
|align=left|Russian Party of Freedom and Justice
|13,961
|6.38%
|-
|style="background-color: "|
|align=left|Andrey Shirokov
|align=left|Party of Pensioners
|13,935
|6.37%
|-
|style="background-color: "|
|align=left|Tatyana Vinnitskaya
|align=left|New People
|13,787
|6.30%
|-
|style="background-color: " |
|align=left|Magomet Yandiev
|align=left|A Just Russia — For Truth
|12,979
|5.93%
|-
|style="background-color: " |
|align=left|Dmitry Koshlakov-Krestovsky
|align=left|Liberal Democratic Party
|11,533
|5.28%
|-
|style="background-color: " |
|align=left|Dmitry Zakharov
|align=left|Communists of Russia
|7,411
|3.39%
|-
|style="background: ;"| 
|align=left|Ketevan Kharaidze
|align=left|Green Alternative
|5,745
|2.63%
|-
|style="background-color: " |
|align=left|Yakov Yakubovich
|align=left|Party of Growth
|4,219
|1.93%
|-
|style="background: ;"| 
|align=left|Anatoly Yushin
|align=left|Civic Platform
|2,307
|1.05%
|-
| colspan="5" style="background-color:#E9E9E9;"|
|- style="font-weight:bold"
| colspan="3" style="text-align:left;" | Total
| 218,839
| 100%
|-
| colspan="5" style="background-color:#E9E9E9;"|
|- style="font-weight:bold"
| colspan="4" |Source:
|
|}

Notes

Sources
208. Центральный одномандатный избирательный округ

References

Russian legislative constituencies
Politics of Moscow